Bascanichthys myersi is an eel in the family Ophichthidae (worm/snake eels). It was described by Albert William Herre in 1932. It is a tropical, marine eel which is known from the western central Pacific Ocean, including Dumaguete, Negros Oriental, in the Philippines.

Named in honor of Stanford University ichthyologist George S. Myers (1905–1985), who was the one who first noticed an undeveloped pectoral fin at the posterior margin of each gill opening of the fish.

Environment
Bascanichthys myersi is a marine, demersal species from the tropical Pacific.

Relationship with humans
Bascanichthys myersi are a harmless species.

References

Ophichthidae
Fish of the Pacific Ocean
Taxa named by Albert William Herre
Fish described in 1932